The Shuping Yang commencement speech controversy took place following a commencement speech made by Shuping Yang, a Chinese undergraduate student graduating from the University of Maryland (UMD), on May 21, 2017. The speech, which praised freedom of speech and democracy, drew the ire of Chinese netizens, state media, as well as the Chinese Students and Scholars Association at the University of Maryland.

Event
The commencement ceremony was held at the Xfinity Center on Sunday, May 21, 2017, for the awarding of 6,051 bachelor's degrees, 1,732 master's degrees, and 585 doctoral degrees to the class of 2017. The commencement included speeches by university president Wallace Loh, businessman and UMD alumnus Mark Ciardi, Shuping Yang, and fellow graduate Gregory Ridgway.

During Yang's speech, she contrasted air quality in China with that of the US, using difference in air quality as a metaphor for her feelings toward freedom of speech and democracy. She described her surprise at seeing a performance of Twilight: Los Angeles, 1992, a one-woman play in which topics of racism, sexism, and politics were openly discussed; she had previously been convinced that this was not possible, as she had believed that "only authorities owned the narrative". She further mentioned student protests, the election in 2016, and the voting system of the United States. Her speech ended with the passage:

"Democracy and free speech should not be taken for granted. Democracy and freedom are the fresh air that is worth fighting for. Freedom is oxygen. Freedom is passion. Freedom is love. And as a French philosopher Jean-Paul Sartre once said, 'freedom is a choice.' Our future is dependent on the choices we make, today and tomorrow. We are all playwrights of the next chapters of our lives. Together we write the human history. My friends, enjoy the fresh air and never ever let it go."

After the speech, university president Wallace Loh, a native of Shanghai, returned to the lectern on the verge of tears and commented, "[the speech] was most inspiring. And like you and your parents, I also am an American by choice, and you have expressed some of the deepest feelings I feel for this country."

Reactions

Chinese Students and Scholars Association 
The speech stirred a sharp reaction among students in the Chinese community of the University of Maryland, notably from members of the pro-government Chinese Students and Scholars Association (CSSA). The CSSA produced a video called "#Proud of China UMD" that alleged that Yang's speech included "false statements and rumor".

State media

The People's Daily, the official newspaper of the Central Committee of the Chinese Communist Party, attacked Yang's speech.

Chinese netizens
Yang's speech was met with an uproar online, and her Sina Weibo account was promptly filled with angry comments. Netizens called her a "traitor", a "liar", and expressed disbelief that an American university would allow such a speech to be made. Some urged others to "dig up dirt" on Yang's family, and the home address of her family was shared widely online.

Many comments criticized the comparison of the air quality between the U.S. and China, though commentators observed that this was mainly a political metaphor. Netizens found out that she grew up in Kunming, leading the Kunming city government to respond that the city's air was "more than likely to be 'sweet and fresh'" given that authorities report that the air quality there is "excellent".

University of Maryland 
In response to the furor, the University of Maryland issued a statement supporting Yang's "right to share her views and her unique perspectives", adding that "respectfully engaging with those whom we disagree are essential skills, both within university walls and beyond". The university stated that Yang was selected to deliver the commencement speech by a committee, on the basis of her performance as a "top student", and stated that it "proudly supports" her right to freedom of speech.

Apology
In what The Guardian called an "apparent attempt to defuse the situation", Yang posted an apology online.

Interpretation
Commentators viewed the furor as emblematic of the tension between the values of Western universities, which espouse freedom of speech as essential to academic inquiry, and the mainland Chinese people who increasingly study at these institutions, partly as a result of Chinese government policy to "assemble broad numbers of students abroad as a positive patriotic energy". In the wake of the controversy following Yang's speech, a BBC editorial referred to these "angry student patriots" as China's "new Red Guards".

References

External links
 Video of the ceremony on the University of Maryland YouTube channel

University of Maryland, College Park
2017 in Maryland
May 2017 events in the United States
Human rights in China
Environment of China
Anti-American sentiment in China
2017 speeches